The Patriot is the soundtrack, on the Hollywood Records label, of the 2000 film The Patriot starring Mel Gibson, Heath Ledger, Joely Richardson, Jason Isaacs and Chris Cooper. The original score was composed by John Williams. Williams replaced composer David Arnold on the project after Arnold's original sketches were rejected.

The album was nominated for the Academy Award for Best Original Score.

Track listing

Track listing

For those interested in hearing the score in chronological order, the order is (roughly) 2, 3, 5, 9, 6, 12, 8, 11, 14, 13, 10, 4, 7, 15, 16, 17.

Use in Politics
 A portion of the music from The Patriot was played after Barack Obama's victory speech as President-elect of the United States on November 4, 2008.

Use in Television
Excerpts of the song The Colonial Cause were remixed and utilized for the opening credits theme song for the shortlived 2004-2005 television series Jack and Bobby which aired on The WB.  The song was played over audio clips of various United States Presidents, and was synchronized with images of the same presidents.  Coincidentally, the series starred Logan Lerman, who had portrayed the role of William Martin in The Patriot, which had been the actor's first role.

References

John Williams soundtracks
2000s film soundtrack albums
2000 soundtrack albums
Hollywood Records soundtracks